Amayé-sur-Orne (literally Amayé on Orne) is a commune in the Calvados department in the Normandy region of northwestern France.  Its inhabitants are known as Amayéens or Amayéennes

Geography
Amayé-sur-Orne is located approximately 10 km south-west of Caen and 5 km east of Évrecy. It can be accessed by road D212 from Vieux in the north which continues south to Thury-Harcourt and by road D41 from Evrecy in the west which continues to Clinchamps-sur-Orne in the east.  Closely located to the town are a number of hamlets including: Saint-Lambert, La Butte, Le Pont du Coudray, and Les Godets.  These villages form a single conurbation with the village.  The rest of the commune is entirely farmland.

The eastern border of the commune is formed by the Orne river. A stream, flows through the village and down to the Orne and another stream flowing to the Orne forms the southern boundary of the commune. The Guigne stream forms the northern border of the commune and also flows to the Orne.

Heraldry

Administration

List of Successive Mayors of Amayé-sur-Orne

Twinning

Amayé-sur-Orne has twinning associations with:
 Johannesberg (Germany) since 1991.

Population

Sites and Monuments

The Ifs Cemetery is a listed site (SC 9 January 1933)
The Butte de l'Orne'' is another World Heritage Site (SC 9 January 1933)
A Lavoir (Public laundry)
The Chateau de la Butte (19th century)
The Chateau de Vaux (18th century)
The Bell Tower Attic of the Church of Notre Dame''' hosts breeding colonies of large bats and is a registered Site of Community Importance (SIC)

Gallery

See also 
 Communes of the Calvados department

References

External links
Amayé-sur-Orne on Géoportail, National Geographic Institute (IGN) website 
Amayé-sur-Orne on the 1750 Cassini Map

Communes of Calvados (department)